The South Western Ghats montane rain forests is an ecoregion in South India, covering the southern portion of the Western Ghats in Karnataka, Kerala and Tamil Nadu at elevations from . Annual rainfall in this ecoregion exceeds .

Setting
The ecoregion is the most species rich in peninsular India, and is home to numerous endemic species. It is estimated that two-thirds of the original forests have been cleared, and only 3,200 square kilometers, or 15% of the intact area, is protected.

The southern portion of the Western Ghats contains the highest peaks in the range, notably Anamudi in Kerala, at 2695 meters elevation. The Ghats intercept the moisture-laden monsoon winds off the Arabian Sea, and the average annual precipitation exceeds 2,800 mm. The northeast monsoon from October to November supplements the June to September southwest monsoon. The South Western Ghats are the wettest portion of peninsular India, and are surrounded by drier ecoregions to the east and north.

Protected areas
As of 1997, this ecoregion encompassed the following 16 protected areas with an area of :
Another 62% is forested but outside protected areas.

Several of the protected areas in the northern portion are included within the Nilgiri Biosphere Reserve, and the Agasthyamala Biosphere Reserve covers the southern portion.

Flora

The cool and moist climate, high rainfall, and variety of microclimates brought about by differences in elevation and exposure supports lush and diverse forests; 35% of the plant species are endemic to the ecoregion. Moist evergreen montane forests are the predominant habitat type. The montane evergreen forests support a great diversity of species ( Animals and plants ). The trees generally form a canopy at 15 to 20 m, and the forests are multistoried and rich in epiphytes, especially orchids. Characteristic canopy trees are Cullenia exarillata, Mesua ferrea, Palaquium ellipticum, Gluta travancorica, and Nageia wallichiana. Nageia is a podocarp conifer with origins in the ancient supercontinent of Gondwana, of which India was formerly part, and a number of other plants in the ecoregion have Gondwana origins. Other evergreen tree species of the montane forest include Calophyllum austroindicum, Garcinia rubro-echinata, Garcinia travancorica, Diospyros barberi, Memecylon subramanii, Memecylon gracile, Goniothalamus rhynchantherus, and Vernonia travancorica.

Shola is a stunted forest with small trees including Pygeum gardneri, Schefflera racemosa, Linociera ramiflora, Syzygium, Rhododendron nilgiricum, Mahonia napaulensis, Elaeocarpus recurvatus, Ilex denticulata, Michelia nilagirica, Actinodaphne bourdillonii and Litsea wightiana. The understorey consists of dense shrubs. These shola forest patches are interspersed with montane grasslands characterized by frost- and fire-resistant grass species like Chrysopogon zeylanicus, Cymbopogon flexuosus, Arundinella ciliata, Arundinella mesophylla, Arundinella tuberculata, Themeda tremula, and Sehima nervosum.

Fauna

Endemic fauna in this ecoregion include Nilgiri tahr (Nilgiritragus hylocrius), Nilgiri pipit (Anthus nilghiriensis), Nilgiri laughingthrush (Montecincla cachinnans), broad-tailed grassbird (Schoenicola platyurus), Nilgiri long-tailed tree mouse (Vandeleuria nilagirica), eight endemic reptile genera encompassing Brachyophidium, Dravidogecko, Melanophidium, Plectrurus, Ristella, Salea, Teretrurus and Xylophis with 90 species, and the six amphibian genera Indotyphlus, Melanobatrachus, Nannobatrachus, Nyctibatrachus, Ranixalus and Uraeotyphlus. The ecoregion also hosts Nilgiri langur (Semnopithecus johnii), Malabar large-spotted civet (Viverra civettina), brown palm civet (Paradoxurus jerdoni), Salim Ali's fruit bat (Latidens salimalii), Nilgiri striped squirrel (Funambulus sublineatus) and Layard's palm squirrel (F. layardi).

References

External links

 
ecoregions of India
Indomalayan ecoregions
Montane forests
Tropical and subtropical moist broadleaf forests
Tropical rainforests of India